Geng Yanbo (born November 1958) is a Chinese politician who served as the mayor of Datong from 2008 to 2013 and the mayor of Taiyuan from 2013 to 2019.

Biography
Geng was born in Heshun County, Shanxi, in November 1958. He entered the workforce in August 1976, and joined the Communist Party of China in December 1981.  In July 1983 he was accepted to Shanxi University, majoring in Chinese language and literary. He also studied at Northwest University, Cheung Kong Graduate School of Business and Central Party School of the Communist Party of China as a part-time student.

In April 1993 he was promoted to become deputy party chief of Lingshi County, a position he held until March 2000. He became party chief of Yuci District in March 2000, and served until February 2004. He was deputy secretary-general of Shanxi Provincial Government in February 2004, and held that office until June 2006. He served as vice-mayor of Taiyuan in June 2006, but having held the position for only a year and a half, when he was transferred to Datong and appointed deputy party chief and vice-mayor. During his term in office, he was is known as "Demolition Geng" after he became mayor in 2008. Geng earned his name from his campaign to demolish much of the city center, relocating 40,000 of its 140,000 households, before rebuilding it in an ancient style, with a view to attracting tourists. In February 2013 he became vice-mayor of Taiyuan, rising to mayor two months later.

On January 15, 2019, Geng resigned.

A 2014 documentary The Chinese Mayor is based on Geng Yanbo.

References

External links

1958 births
Living people
Shanxi University alumni
Central Party School of the Chinese Communist Party alumni
Northwest University (China) alumni
Cheung Kong Graduate School of Business alumni
People's Republic of China politicians from Shanxi
Chinese Communist Party politicians from Shanxi